Toshiko Akiyoshi Trio featuring Motohiko Hino - Live at Blue Note Tokyo '97 is a jazz trio album recorded by pianist Toshiko Akiyoshi featuring drummer Motohiko Hino.  It was recorded in 1997 in the Tokyo Blue Note club and was released by Nippon Crown Records.

Track listing 
"Long Yellow Road" (Akiyoshi)
"Count Your Blessings Instead of Sheep" (Berlin)
"Un Poco Loco" (Powell)
"Sophisticated Lady" (Ellington)
"I Know Who Loves You" (Akiyoshi)
"When You Wish upon a Star" (Harline, Washington)
"Chic Lady" (Akiyoshi)

Personnel
Toshiko Akiyoshi – piano 
Yoshio Suzuki – bass 
Motohiko Hino – drums

References
Nippon Crown CRCJ-9154 
Toshiko Akiyoshi Trio Live at Blue Note Tokyo '97 (a.k.a. Japanese Trio: Live 1997) at [ Allmusic.com]

Toshiko Akiyoshi live albums
1997 live albums